Svetlan Kondev (born 23 January 1976) is a former Bulgarian footballer. Kondev was capped 7 times for Bulgaria U21. He is currently working as a coach at Montana.

Career
At a young age Kondev was playing at the squad of Sliven. In season 1997-98, at the age of 21, he made his debut in professional football with Maritsa Plovdiv. In the next year Kondev was part of the Litex Lovech squad, with which he played 3 matches and scored 1 goal (against Widzew Łódź) in the qualifying rounds of the UEFA Champions League.

In 2000, he signed with Belasitsa Petrich. In 2001 gone in Plovdiv, signing with local Lokomotiv, but one year later returned in Petrich. Until 2005 Kondev played three seasons in Belasitsa. He earned 81 appearances and scored 9 goals for the club.

In 2005, at the age of 29, he signed with Maltese Pietà Hotspurs. In 2008 Kondev returned in Bulgaria, signing a contract for two seasons with PFC Montana. With the club he became champion of Second West Division for the 2008-09 season.

References

External links
 $

Bulgarian footballers
1976 births
Living people
Association football midfielders
First Professional Football League (Bulgaria) players
OFC Sliven 2000 players
PFC Litex Lovech players
PFC Belasitsa Petrich players
PFC Lokomotiv Plovdiv players
Pietà Hotspurs F.C. players
FC Montana players
Expatriate footballers in Malta
Bulgarian expatriates in Malta
Sportspeople from Sliven